Priti sapru (also spelled as Preeti Sapru), is an Indian actress known for her works in Punjabi and Hindi cinema. She featured in a number of films including Nimmo, and Qurbani Jatt Di among others, with actors Veerendra, Gurdasmaan and Rajbabbar.

Early life 
D.K. Sapru was her father, and actress Hemvathi Sapru was her mother. Actor TejSapru is her brother and screenwriter Reema Rakesh Nath is her sister. Sapru's family used to live in Bandra. Her grandfather held the position of 'Treasurer' for the Dogra Kingdom. She studied at St. Joseph's High School, Juhu, Bombay, and started acting at the age of 13.

Career 
She started her career with the film Habari in 1979, then appeared in small parts in Laawaris (1981) and Avtaar (1983). She was seen in lead roles in Punjabi movies, and as a leading and supporting actress in numerous Hindi movies. Priti was the pioneer of the album activity through Bhangra Gidda in 1990.  She wrote Zameen Asmaan, which starred actors Shashi Kapoor, Sanjay Dutt, Rekha, and Anita Raaj. She wrote directed and produced the Punjabi movie  Qurbani Jatt Di. She launched the first Punjabi channel (Alpha), which was a part of Zee at that time.

Sapru was active in initiating the relief rally for earthquake victims in Jammu and Kashmir and has also participated in various social activities in Punjab. She is actively forwarding donations or any other help required for the NGOs such as Balbhavan, Catherine Home, and Premnidhi.	

Sapru has followed Narendra Modi since he was a BJP candidate in Gujarat and has been active in campaigning for rallies with Arun Jaitley and Vijay Sampla in Punjab. Sapru accompanies Jaitley in social activities but is also considered to be a close aide to Sangeeta Arun Jaitley. Rajnath Singh invited Sapru to join the BJP, and she formally joined the party during the Fateh Rally in Punjab on 23 February 2014. Sapru has plans to initiate an anti-drug campaign in Punjab.

In 2018 she lobbied for minority status to be granted to Sikhs in Jammu and Kashmir.

Awards 
Sapru has received the Punjab State Award for Best Actress in 1995, the "Mahila Shiromani 1998" for contributions to Punjabi Cinema, the "First Lady Director in Punjabi Film History" from First Lady Vimala Sharma and "Punjabi Ratna" from the Press club along with Dr. Manmohan Singh (ex-Prime Minister), Chief Minister Prakash Singh Badal, and sports persona Milkha Singh in 2002. "Punjab Shiromani" was presented by Amarinder Singh from Patiala University for the first time to a non-Punjabi. The "Hamdard Award" from Ajit Daily was given to her by Prakash Singh Badal among other awards. She received the Punjabi Legend Award for contributions to the Punjabi film Industry from Pranab Mukherjee in Chennai celebrate of 100 years of Indian Cinema in November 2013.

Personal life 
She is married to architect Upvan Sudarshan Ahluwalia. They have twin daughters Riya Walia and Rene Walia. She is proficient in Hindi, English, and Punjabi.

Filmography

References

External links

Priti Sapru Walia at instagram

Living people
1957 births
20th-century Indian actresses
Actresses from Mumbai
Indian film actresses
Actresses in Punjabi cinema